Con River is the name of the following rivers:

Côn River in Bình Định Province, Vietnam
Con River (Galicia) in Galicia, Spain
Con River (Nghe An) in Nghệ An Province, Vietnam